The 1969 Cleveland Indians season was a season in American baseball. The club finished in last place in the newly established American League East with a record of 62 wins and 99 losses. The 1969 season seemed hopeful before the season started, based on the Indians modest 86-75 record the previous season, along with their solid pitching. However, a 1-15 start shattered any illusions of a successful season. Not helping, was that the Indians strong pitching the previous season fell apart. Luis Tiant fell to 9-20 in 1969, and didn't look like the same pitcher from 1968, when he went 21-9, with a 1.60 ERA. Sam McDowell stayed solid at the very least, going 18-14, with a 2.94 ERA.

Offseason 
 October 8, 1968: Eddie Fisher was traded by the Cleveland Indians to the California Angels for Jack Hamilton.
 October 15, 1968: 1968 Major League Baseball expansion draft
Chico Salmon was drafted from the Indians by the Seattle Pilots as the 11th pick.
Lou Piniella was drafted from the Indians by the Pilots as the 28th pick.

Regular season

Season standings

Record vs. opponents

Notable transactions 
 April 10, 1969: Oscar Zamora was released by the Indians.
 April 19, 1969: Joe Azcue, Vicente Romo and Sonny Siebert were traded by the Indians to the Boston Red Sox for Dick Ellsworth, Ken Harrelson and Juan Pizarro.
 June 12, 1969: Rob Gardner was traded by the Indians to the New York Yankees for John Orsino.
 June 20, 1969: Lee Maye was traded by the Indians to the Washington Senators for Bill Denehy and cash.

Opening Day Lineup

Roster

Player stats

Batting

Starters by position 
Note: Pos = Position; G = Games played; AB = At bats; H = Hits; Avg. = Batting average; HR = Home runs; RBI = Runs batted in

Other batters 
Note: G = Games played; AB = At bats; H = Hits; Avg. = Batting average; HR = Home runs; RBI = Runs batted in

Pitching

Starting pitchers 
Note: G = Games pitched; IP = Innings pitched; W = Wins; L = Losses; ERA = Earned run average; SO = Strikeouts

Other pitchers 
Note: G = Games pitched; IP = Innings pitched; W = Wins; L = Losses; ERA = Earned run average; SO = Strikeouts

Relief pitchers 
Note: G = Games pitched; W = Wins; L = Losses; SV = Saves; ERA = Earned run average; SO = Strikeouts

Awards and honors 

All-Star Game

Farm system 

Statesville franchise moved to Monroe, June 20, 1969

Notes

References 
1969 Cleveland Indians team page at Baseball Reference
1969 Cleveland Indians team page at www.baseball-almanac.com

Cleveland Guardians seasons
Cleveland Indians season
Cleveland Indians